The 1970–71 FA Trophy was the second season of the FA Trophy. The competition was set up for non-league clubs which paid their players and were therefore not eligible to enter the FA Amateur Cup.

First qualifying round

Ties

Replays

2nd replay

Second qualifying round

Ties

Replays

Third qualifying round

Ties

Replays

2nd replay

1st round
The teams that given byes to this round are Macclesfield Town, Bradford Park Avenue, Hillingdon Borough, Wimbledon, Worcester City, Romford, Weymouth, Yeovil Town, Wigan Athletic, Gainsborough Trinity, South Shields, Bangor City, Stafford Rangers, Great Harwood, Mossley, Kidderminster Harriers, Bromsgrove Rovers, Bridgwater Town, Kirkby Town, Burscough, Telford United, Chelmsford City, Barnet, Hereford United, Kettering Town, Nuneaton Borough, Dartford, Grantham, Mossley, Buxton, Bideford and Burton Albion.

Ties

Replays

2nd replay

2nd round

Ties

Replays

3rd round

Ties

Replays

4th round

Ties

Replays

Semi finals

Ties

Final

References

General
 : Football Club History Database: FA Trophy 1970-71

Specific

1970–71 domestic association football cups
League
1970-71